Bathyxylophila excelsa is a species of sea snail, a marine gastropod mollusk in the family Larocheidae, t

It was originally placed in the subfamily Skeneinae of the family Turbinidae.

Distribution
This species occurs in bathyal zone off New Zealand.

References

External links
 To World Register of Marine Species

Larocheidae
Gastropods described in 1988